Aster Amoyo (born Asteria; May 10, 1956) is a Filipino television host, entertainment writer and talent manager. She currently hosts a YouTube channel TicTalk with Aster Amoyo. She has interviewed president Bongbong Marcos and First-lady Liza Araneta-Marcos.

Biography

Early life
Amoyo was born on May 10, 1964 in Borongan, Eastern Samar to Bonifacio Amoyo and Maria Salome Amosco. Her parents were both widowed young, having children of their former marriages, before they got together and had children with Aster and her siblings, Meriam and Mario. She finished her high school studies in Eastern Samar and went to Manila afterwards, having took a two-year secretarial course which led her to her showbiz career.

Career
In 1974, she was taken in as secretary of veteran Public Relations specialist and talent manager Norma Japitana at Vicor Music Corporation. When the recording company moved its office to Aurora Boulevard in Cubao in 1976, she got promoted as Public Relations Assistant. Joining Orly Ilacad, Amoyo formed the OctoArts International in January 1978. Under the said recording company, she helped managed the careers of some of Philippines' pop icons like Eva Eugenio, Boyfriends, Cristy Mendoza, and Imelda Papin. In the 1980s, the recording company spawned the careers of other Filipino singers such as Pops Fernandez, Jamie Rivera, Joey Albert, Francis Magalona, Michael V., and Ogie Alcasid.

When Ilacad branched out into movie production and built OctoArts Films, Amoyo was selected to spearhead the advertising and media promotions. Inside the production company, she helped managed the careers of celebrated stars like Jeric Raval, Lara Morena, Mikee Villanueva, Shirley Fuentes and Jennifer Mendoza. She wrote for different popular showbiz magazines like Liwayway, Movie Flash, Kislap, and others.

Her career in television hosting started in 1993 with showbiz-oriented talk show Isang Tanong, Isang Sagot together with Anselle Beluso. In 1996, GMA Network tapped her services to host Inside Showbiz.

After her tenure with OctoArts in December 1999, she helped her Japanese friend Koji Miyashita in putting up his business in the Philippines. Amoyo later then served as Managing Director for the Pilipinas International Marketing Services, Inc. (PIMSI) (later renamed to Key Square, Inc). She started the company in 1997 with just a few staff members but due to her leadership, the numbers grew until the time she retired. While working in the company, she contributed articles for the entertainment magazines called, S Magazine, Inside Showbiz and Celebrity Living which made an indelible mark in the market.

In 2012, Amoyo became one of the segment hosts of the late night variety show Walang Tulugan with the Master Showman until its conclusion in 2016, after the passing of its host, German Moreno.

Member of the Philippine Artists Managers, Inc (PAMI), she served as talent manager for Viva Films actors and actresses such as Jay Manalo, Cristina Gonzales, Jao Mapa, Alonzo Muhlach, Kier Legaspi, Rey Abellana, among others. She currently hosts a YouTube channel entitled TicTalk with Aster Amoyo.

She became known for her work on Rubberman (1996) as guest actor, Wag na wag kang lalayo (1996) and Sanggano (1997) both in charge of its publicity and promotions.

John Regala Incident
Amoyo, together with Nadia Montenegro and Chuckie Dreyfus, helped raise funds together for the film actor John Regala who was suffering from liver cirrhosis. When Regala claimed that he never received a single amount from the fundraising efforts, Amoyo reacted to his statement and accused the actor of lying.

Personal life
Aster Amoyo was married to Ernesto Reyes with whom she had a daughter, Aila Marie. They eventually got separated. She currently lives in Cainta, Rizal with her mother and her relatives. 

She is a Roman Catholic.

Filmography

References

External links
Aster Amoyo | Facebook Page
 

1955 births
Living people
People from Borongan
Filipino women journalists
Filipino television talk show hosts
Filipino Roman Catholics
Talent managers
Entertainment journalists
21st-century Filipino women writers
20th-century Filipino women writers
News YouTubers
Filipino YouTubers
Vicor Music
Writers from Manila
Secretaries
Manila Bulletin people
GMA Network personalities
ABS-CBN personalities
Viva Films
People from Cainta